Gen Sekine (January 2, 1942 – March 27, 2017) was a Japanese dog breeder and serial killer who, together with his common-law wife Hiroko Kazama, murdered at least four clients in Kumagaya from April to August 1993 in what were called the Saitama Dog Lover Murders (Japanese: 埼玉愛犬家連続殺人事件). Both were sentenced to death for their crimes, but Sekine died on death row prior to execution.

Early life and accomplices

Gen Sekine 
Gen Sekine was born on January 2, 1942, in Chichibu, Saitama. After graduating high school, he worked at a pachinko parlor and later a Chinese restaurant in his hometown. One night, the restaurant burned down in a mysterious fire that also killed its owner; locals spread rumors that Sekine had killed the shopkeeper and set it on fire to cover his tracks, but this was never proven. When he was in his twenties, Sekine started breeding dogs, for which he later earned celebrity status in the industry for popularizing the Alaskan Malamute breed in the country. Some sources claim that he was also responsible for the boom of Siberian Huskies.

Sekine originally ran a pet shop and animal leasing business in his hometown, where he gained notoriety for his malicious business practices, often stealing dogs and selling them to customers, or killing the customer's dog and selling them an entirely new one. Residents in the area also complained that he looked after dangerous animals such as tigers and lions. Due to brewing problems with gangsters, Sekine moved temporarily to Itō, Shizuoka, but in 1982, he returned to Saitama Prefecture and opened the "Africa Kennel" in Kumagaya.

Sekine was adept at predicting human behavior, and many were thus drawn to his unique humor and speaking skills, which were contrary to his yakuza-like style. On the other hand, many of his peers avoided involving themselves too deeply with him due to his business practices, propensity to threaten customers and his friendship with local gangsters. In addition, he was a pathological liar who made many boastful claims to not only acquaintances and customers, but also to interviewers for magazines and television programs, with the aim of advertising his store. One such lie concerned his missing pinky finger, which he claimed had been bitten off by a lion in Africa; in reality, it had been cut off by members of the yakuza for failing to pay debts.

According to accomplice Eikō Yamazaki, Sekine followed a set of five rules which he called his "murder philosophy":

 1. Kill those who are not good for the world
 2. Do not kill for insurance purposes, as you will get caught
 3. Kill the greedy
 4. It is important not to shed blood
 5. The most important thing is to make the body disappear

Yamazaki further claimed that Sekine often bragged in private about committing the perfect crime, that he would never get caught and "if there was an Olympic event for killing, [he] would get the gold medal". Despite his enthusiastic and boastful attitude, Sekine was often described as small-minded and nervous, which was reflected with his obsession to constantly get rid of any incriminating evidence. Eikō said that while he was always frightened, he was absolutely confident that he would never be caught.

Hiroko Kazama
Hiroko Kazama was born on February 19, 1957, in Kumagaya. She was raised by her father, a childcare worker and later a real estate agent. A quiet but strong woman who loved big dogs, Kazama was studying to work as a land surveyor to help her father financially. In 1983, she visited the Africa Kennel where she met Sekine, and after getting acquainted, the pair were married not long after.

Both of them had been previously married (Sekine having married thrice before; Kazama was divorced with two children), so in order to show her devotion for him, Kazama carved a dragon tattoo on her back as a sign of their unity, in opposition to his previous wives, who had tattooed his name. Some theories suggest that Sekine had married her due to her rich father's inheritance, while others suggest it was for her ability to present herself at dog shows and finance management. While both of them cheated on one another, prompted by Sekine physically abusing her and her children, they nevertheless supported each other in managing the shop and the business.

In order to prevent her common-law husband from wasting the money, Kazama faked their divorce and started living as his common-law wife, which allowed for her to be appointed the president of the company. While on the surface it appeared to be a joint-stock agreement, the actual management was supervised by Sekine, while Kazama dealt exclusively with the finances.

Eikō Yamazaki 
Eikō Yamazaki was born in Toyama Prefecture in January 1956. A bulldog breeder living out of a remodeled freight car in Katashina, Gunma Prefecture, he first heard of Sekine after seeing him participate in a dog show. When he visited the Africa Kennel to learn about his management philosophy, he was unexpectedly invited to work there as an executive. However in reality, he became Sekine's driver and unwilling accomplice.

Murders 
Sekine's modus operandi consisted of dismembering the victims' corpses, which he called "making the body disappear". All four of his known victims were dismebered in Yamazaki's bathroom, and their bones, skin, tissues and internal organs were cut down to several centimeters. The bones were then incinerated in drums, along with clothing and personal items, to ash, all of which were then thrown in forests and rivers. Sekine also devised to burn the body themselves, but as he knew it would generate an unpleasant and easily noticeable odor, he burned them until only the bones were left, and then checked to make sure that there was no leftover burned skin. When conducting this procedure, Yamazaki claimed that Sekine found it "interesting and fun".

Akio Kawasaki 
Akio Kawasaki, a 39-year-old executive of an industrial waste treatment company in Gyōda, befriended Sekine after visiting the Africa Kennel to buy a dog. At the time, he was inclined by his brother to expand his business ventures into dog breeding, and so, he bought two Rhodesian Ridgebacks for 11 million yen. However, Kawasaki was later informed by an acquaintance that the market price for such dogs was much lower, and that both dogs were too old and unsuited for breeding. Later on, the female escaped, rendering breeding impossible, causing the angered Kawasaki to return the male dog and ask for a refund. At the time, the Africa Kennel was in dire financial straits, prompting Sekine and Kazama to kill their client to avoid giving the money back.

On the evening of April 20, 1993, Kawasaki was invited to chat with Sekine in his station wagon, where he served him a drink laced with a cyanide capsule which instantly killed him. When Yamazaki returned to the garage, Sekine showed him the body and threatened to kill him and send his body to his family if he ratted him out. He then started dismembering the body, and ordered Yamazaki to dispose of his car at a garage in Tokyo.

After doing so, he returned to Kumagaya, picked up Kazama and the two headed to Tokyo in two separate cars, leaving Kawasaki's car in an underground parking lot in Yaesu and staging it as the executive had disappeared, making sure it was recorded on the ANPR. During this, Kazama inquired whether the plan had worked, with Yamazaki telling her that it would "be okay if [she] kept silent."

After parting with Kazama in Kumagaya, he returned to his freight car in Katashina. On the next morning, he found drums containing Kawasaki's charred remains and belongings, which Sekine instructed him to get rid of. As demanded, Yamazaki disposed of the body parts in the Usune River in Kawaba, and the burnt bones, ashes and personal items were scattered in the national forest near Katashina.

Yasutoshi Endo and Susumu Wakui 
Endo was the leader of an Inagawa-kai-affiliated criminal group who acted as the supervisor of Sekine, who was also a customer of the Africa Kennel. Following Kawasaki's disappearance, he attended a meeting with his family who suspected that Sekine had something to do with it. Agreeing with their sentiment, he began to extort Sekine for a large amount of money. Eventually, Sekine and Kazama, who were planning on building a new pet shop, began worrying that their property would be taken away, and decided to get rid of Endo. At the same time, they concluded that they should also dispose of his chauffeur, Susumu Wakui, who had no prior interactions with either of them.

On the night of July 21, 1993, Sekine, Kazama and Yamazaki drove to a location designated by Endo. The couple got out to meet him, while Yamazaki stayed in the car. Initially, they pretended to comply with the gangster's request and handed over a resignation certificate, as well as two drinks which had been poisoned with strychnine capsules to both Endo and Wakui. Endo collapsed shortly afterwards, but Wakui somehow resisted the effects, so their assailants told him to call an ambulance to save time, letting him run around searching for help. After that, the couple got into the car, put Wakui on the front seat, and let Yamazaki leave on the pretext of looking after Endo. While driving on a deserted road along the Arakawa embankment, Wakui began convulsing violently, enough to crack the car's windshield, before dying.

After returning to pick up Endo's body, the trio boarded two cars and headed towards Katashina in separate directions (along the way, Yamazaki had to make a U-turn and move through another tollbooth to avoid a routine police inspection). The men's bodies were dismembered in Yamazaki's bathroom, with the former sharpening the knives while Sekine and Kazama doing the dismemberment. Yamazaki later claimed that Sekine had threatened to dispose of him in the same manner if he told anyone, while Kazama hummed enka songs. After they finished dismembering the bodies, Kazama returned to Kumagaya while Sekine and Yamazaki were left behind to incinerate the bones and clothing. The remains and ashes were then thrown into the Usune, Nuri and Katashina rivers.

Mitsue Sekiguchi 
Mitsue Sekiguchi, a housewife from Gyōda, became acquainted with Sekine when her second son started working at the Africa Kennel, and the two soon began an affair. However, because the store was having financial difficulties due to the construction of a new kennel and Endo's extortion, Sekine pleaded with Sekiguchi to become a shareholder of the African Kennel and invest in it. Initially, Sekine only planned to steal the money, but he realized that the shareholder lie would be revealed eventually, and if that happened, not only the investments by the price of dogs sold in the past (six Alaskan Malamutes, amounting to 9 million yen) may have to be returned. This, coupled with the fact that he was becoming annoyed with Sekiguchi, prompted Sekine to kill her.

On the afternoon of August 26, 1993, Sekine and Sekiguchi boarded his car in Gyōda, and while travelling around the area, he gave her a drink containing a strychnine capsule and killed her. He then stole 2.7 million yen from her. Sekine then contacted Yamazaki, and told him to come and get rid of another body. According to Yamazaki, Sekine dismembered her remains like his previous victims, but unlike them, he committed sexual acts on the corpse before doing so. Early next morning, her burned remains and ashes were thrown in the Nuri River.

Sekine is believed to have committed this murder entirely of his own accord, as nothing indicated Yamazaki knew the victim prior to her death. There were suspicions that Kazama might have been involved, but as all evidence to this theory is circumstantial, she was not charged with it.

Investigation and arrests 
On the day after his disappearance, Akio Kawasaki's family filed a missing persons report to the Gyōda Police Station. At first, it was surmized that he had simply ran away, but after his car was found abandoned in the Yaesu parking lot, prefectural police began to suspect that something had gone wrong and launched an investigation. While interviewing family members, it was learned that Kawasaki had trouble with Gen Sekine, and since there were rumors that he had been involved in several disappearances years prior, the police began monitoring him and Yamazaki. However, the criminals managed to avoid detection for the time being, and after the Endo–Wakui and Sekiguchi cases were connected, the police began a full-scale operation in the fall of that same year. They strengthened their surveillance efforts, and advised Sekine's associates not meet with him unaccompanied, but they could not arrest him due to lack of sufficient evidence. The Second Investigation Division attempted to have him arrested on fraud charges relating to the construction of the new kennel, but at this point it was judged too difficult to prove, and the idea was abandoned.

On January 26, 1994, a man named Yoshinori Ueda was arrested for killing several dog breeders in Osaka. Although unrelated to the case, rumors spread that similar cases were occurring in Saitama, and in mid-February, the media focused their attention on the Africa Kennel with daily coverage. While Sekine insisted on his innocence, the victims' families continued to accuse him. However, since police had no evidence at the time, their accusations were considered baseless.

On September 22, the Saitama Prefectural Police arrested an acquaintance of Sekine, a former JGSDF officer from Ōmama, Gunma on unrelated fraud charges. It was suggested by the media that the man might know something about the cases, and during his interrogation, the officer admitted to being somewhat involved in the 1984 disappearances (see below), and hinted at Sekine's responsibility for the new cases.

On October 17, police attempted to solve the case by questioning Yamazaki, who denied any involvement. Not long after, he fled with his second wife, and the prefectural police issued arrest warrant for her on charges of embezzling 50 million yen from a construction company. Mrs. Yamazaki was arrested, and Eikō later accept an interview with the investigators. His interrogation resumed on December 3, and he eventually confessed that he was involved. Ten days later, Yamazaki guided the investigator to Katashina, where he indicated the location of Kawasaki's remains. As a result, Sekine and Kazama was arrested on murder and concealment of a corpse on January 5, 1995, with Yamazaki following three days later on the same charges.

Search for physical evidence 
From January to February 1995, acting upon Yamazaki's confessions, the Saitama and Gunma Prefectural Police conducted a joint search centered around Kumagaya and Katashina. During the search, they covered many locations, such as Kumagaya, Katashina, Kawaba, Shirasawa, Tone, Gangnam, Kawagoe, Niiza and others.

As a result, bone and teeth fragments, amulets, watches and other items were found near the Katashima Forest, while additional unburned bone fragments, mobile phones, house and car keys, dentures, etc. were found in the Nuri River. Due to the fact some of the bones were burned at high temperatures, DNA testing was rendered impossible, but authorities managed to identify the victims through the leftover items. A large number of investigators searched the river to locate the objects, finding many personal items that would serve as material evidence later on. A similar situation was reported in Gunma Prefecture, where an investigator reported finding discarded metal objects that had been there for as long as two years.

Trials
In addition to the extremely scant physical evidence, the trial was prolonged due to Sekine and Kazama blaming each other for the crimes, while the prosecution alleged that all three parties were equally to blame. In addition, Yamazaki, who had given full confessions at the investigation stage, had cooperated willingly and had even struck a plea deal with the prosecutors, refused to testify at the trial stage.

Initial trial 
On July 7, 1995, Yamazaki's trial was held at the Urawa District Court (present-day Saitama District Court), and the facts of the indictment were generally acknowledged. Subsequently, on July 24, Sekine and Kazama were brought to trial in the same court, with former pleading no contest. His lawyer criticized the prosecution for not disclosing evidence or affidavits, while Kazama claimed that she had been threatened into submission to help dispose of the bodies, and was not involved in the murders or dismemberments themselves. In the Kawasaki case, she admitted that she had driven his car to Tokyo with Yamazaki, but denied knowing that it was his or why she was doing it in the first place.

On October 6, at Yamazaki's third court hearing, he testified to confessing due to an agreement with the prosecution, but at his co-defendants' trial, he refused to testify. According to him, it was because the Urawa District Prosecutor had broken a promise that he would release him if he gave enough evidence. He also revealed that he had negotiated to have his wife released on bail, and they were allowed to have in the prosecutor's office. On the other hand, the Urawa District Prosecutor's Office said at a press conference that his wife's bail had been carried out through due process, denying the existence of an agreement. Since then, Sekine and Kazama's defense counsel criticized the proceedings and argued that Yamazaki should not be considered a reliable witness due to his judicial transactions. When the prosecutor in charge of keeping Yamazaki as a witness appeared at trial on July 19, 1995, he admitted to allowing him to meet his wife, but continued to deny making an agreement with the accused.

On November 2, with the participation of judges, prosecutors and lawyers, the Katashina crime scene was explored for verification. Fifteen days later, the prosecutor's office demanded a 3-year prison term for Yamazaki; in response, his defense counsel pleaded to a lesser sentence, and because of this, he was acquitted and given a suspended sentence.

On November 20, Yamazaki appeared as a witness in the main trial for the first time. A cross-examination was conducted, but as declared previously, he refused to testify, and each subsequent time he appeared as a witness, he criticized the prosecution and police, and swore at the judges. The prosecutors initially planned to have him as a key witness, but resorted to the affidavits at the investigations stage in the end. On December 15, Yamazaki was sentenced to three years imprisonment for his participation in the murders. While it was acknowledged that he was coerced, it was pointed out that he was not physically abused or kept under surveillance, was only verbally threatened, had many chances to contact authorities and participated in the crimes of his own initiative. He later appealed the sentence to the Tokyo High Court, but it was dismissed, and he served his sentence in full.

On September 3, 1998, when asked a question at his trial, Sekine, who until then had neither denied or admitted responsibility, finally confessed to being involved. However, he claimed that the murders were masterminded by Kazama and that Yamazaki had killed the victims, while he had only participated in order to protect the love of his wife. Following these statements, the couple constantly confronted each other.

On July 6, 2000, the prosecutor's office demanded the death penalty for both of them. Closing arguments were held for four consecutive days from October 10 to 14, with Sekine pleading for life imprisonment while Kazama asked to be found not guilty. Approximately five years since the trial began, after a total of 105 court sessions, the defendants were found guilty.

On March 21, 2001, the Urawa District Court sentenced Gen Sekine and Hiroko Kazama to death. In the final statements, the judges scrutinized the convicts' statements as conflicting and intricate, and pointed out that even if there were secret agreements between Yamazaki and the prosecutors, his confession included facts which only the perpetrator could have known. As such, even if there were certain falsehoods or exaggerations, his confession would still be considered credible.

The former couple eventually admitted to killing three of the victims, besides Yasutoshi Endo, who they claimed had been strangled by Yamazaki. However, no discernible motive or incentive could be found in this claim, and this was quickly rejected. Concerning the Kawasaki and Wakui cases, while it was acknowledged that Sekine was the principal mastermind and murderer, it was also noted that Kazama willingly offered to participate in both crimes, and was thus held equally as responsible. And when it came to the Sekiguchi killing, no conclusive evidence could link her to this crime and Sekine is considered solely responsible, but the fact that the former claimed the latter masterminded the whole idea and that the possibility of an accomplice was not impossible, this possibility was taken into consideration during the judgment.

Appeal trial
On December 5, 2003, the couple's first appeal trial was held at the Tokyo High Court, with their defense alleging that there were factual inaccuracies in the first trial. After his release, Yamazaki was brought as a witness, but his testimony was considered ambiguous, except for criticizing the prosecutors, defense counsel and questioning the court system. Peculiarly, he also testified in Kazama's defense for some time, but has not given a clear reason as to why. On February 14, 2005, Kazama admitted to a degree that she was involved in dismembering the bodies of Endo and Wakui, and on July 11, the Tokyo High Court dismissed their appeal. Both later appealed to the Supreme Court, but on June 5, 2009, Justice Yuki Furuta dismissed their appeal, and on June 22 of that year, their death sentences were finalized.

Possible additional murders 
In 1984, at least three men and women connected to Sekine disappeared in Chichibu and the surrounding areas. The Saitama Prefectural Police searched their bodies, but none were ever located. In addition to these, there have been suggestions that other vanishings and suspicious deaths might have been his doing, but only the following three were reported on in the newspapers:

 February 11, 1984: a Chichibu yakuza disappeared without a trace. Sekine's older brother owned debts to the man, and after Sekine had married to Kazama, he offered to pay him off, but the yakuza refused to cooperate. On the day of his disappearance, he went out to pick up a mysterious man in his car, and was never seen again. According to people he knew, he claimed that a 'huge amount of money [would] arrive shortly'.
 May 8, 1984: a truck driver and former clerk at the Africa Kennel disappeared. Since Sekine had replaced a signboard that the man had previously placed, he contacted him and demanded that he be repaid for his wasted effort. He then received a phone call from Sekine at a nearby gas station, was instructed to meet him at an unknown location, and vanished soon after.
 early June 1984: a female snack bar owner, the wife of a former JGSDF officer living in Fukaya, disappears. The couple often argued about money, as her husband had sold her luxury foreign cars without permission, and the woman soon disappeared. According to the officer's claims, he beat her to death during a quarrel and later asked Sekine to help dispose of the body. Even if his claims are confirmed in the future, since the crime can be considered manslaughter and not murder, neither man could be charged with it as the statute of limitations has expired.

The former official also claimed that he had helped dismember and dispose of the previous victims' corpses, and based on his statements, a search was conducted in April 1995. However, taking into account that 11 years had passed by then, the search was further complicated by the fact that riverbed had been dried up after the demolition of the old Oshikiri Bridge in 1991. The authorities also inspected the old kennel in Kumagaya, where the officer claimed the bodies were dismembered, but nothing of note was found. Despite this, Kazama hinted during a court session about the missing yakuza, suggesting that she at very least knew about the case.

Sekine's death 
After his and his wife's convictions, both were sent to await execution at the Tokyo Detention House. In November 2016, Sekine fell ill and had to be rushed for treatment in the prison hospital. He died of multiple organ failure on the morning of March 27, 2017, aged 75.

Aftermath 
 Immediately after Sekine and the others' arrests, the Great Hanshin earthquake struck on January 17, 1995, forcing the media to reduce exposure on this case. Shortly after, it was overshadowed even further by the actions of Aum Shinrikyo, and to this day is often confused with the Osaka Dog Lover Murders that took place during the same timespan.
 The Africa Kennel went bankrupt shortly after the incident and went out of business. The building and office themselves have not been demolished, however, and remain standing in Kumagaya.
 Yamazaki appeared on an episode of the TV program Off Record!, dated June 20, 2001, shortly after the discovery of an amulet, thought to be Kawasaki's, depicting a daikokuten.
 Yamazaki later speculated that Sekine had killed others before, judging from his expertise and dexterity at dismembering the bodies. In his book dedicated to the case, he noted that the yakuza and truck driver who had disappeared in 1984 were friends of Sekine, and that the latter had a weird ritual of wrapping "venison" around bamboo sticks. He also said that Sekine had once told him that he belonged to the Takada Group, an organized crime group affiliated with the Inagawa-kai.
 Kazama, who remains on death row, continues to assert her innocence, a claim supported by Yamazaki, who in turn says that Sekine had coerced them both into committing the crimes.

See also 
 List of serial killers by country
 The 2010 film Cold Fish, directed by Sion Sono, was loosely based on the case.

Bibliography

References

External links 
 Yamazaki's 2001 interview transcript on 'Off Record!' (archived)
 Supreme Court Decision (2009)

1942 births
2017 deaths
20th-century criminals
Deaths from multiple organ failure
Dog breeders
History of Saitama Prefecture
Japanese male criminals
Japanese serial killers
Japanese people convicted of murder
Japanese prisoners sentenced to death
Male serial killers
Necrophiles
Poisoners
People convicted of murder by Japan
People from Saitama Prefecture
Prisoners sentenced to death by Japan
Serial killers who died in prison custody